Melanie Dimantas (born April 22, 1958) is a Brazilian screenwriter from the city of São Paulo. Dimantas is known for co-authoring the Brazilian movie Carlota Joaquina: Princess of Brazil (1995), with the filmmaker Carla Camurati.

Career 

In the year of 1980, Dimantas graduated in social sciences by the University of São Paulo (USP). At the same time, she graduated as a history and geography teacher, in the same university.

Melanie Dimantas is known for the script of the movie "I Don't Want to Talk About It Now" (1991), written with Maurício Farias and Evandro Mesquita. This movie won the prize of best script in the Gramado Film Festival, the most important festival of cinema in Brazil. Also, she is co-author of the movies "The Other Side of the Street" (2004), "My Sweet Orange Tree" (2012) and has collaborated in several episodes of the famous Brazilian TV Show "City of Men" (2002 - 2005).

Besides the work as a screenwriter, Dimantas also teaches Screenwriting in the Pontifical Catholic University (PUC-Rio), in the course of Social Communication - Cinema.

Personal life 

Melanie Dimantas has three children with her ex-husband Mauro Farias: Paulo [b. 1985], Helena [b. 1988] and Raquel [b.1993].

Awards and nominations

Gramado Film Festival
 1991 - (Won) Best Screenplay for "I Don't Want Talk About it Now" (1991), shared with Maurício Farias and Evandro Mesquita 
ACIE Award, Brazil 
 2005 - (Won) Best Screenplay for "The Other Side of the Street" (2004), shared with Marcos Bernstein 
 2009 - (Nominated) Best Screenplay for "Camila Jam" (2007), shared with: Elena Soarez and Murilo Salles 
 2011 - (Nominated) Best Screenplay for "Blue Eyes" (2009), shared with: Paulo Halm
Cinema Brazil Grand Prize
 2005 - (Nominated) Best Original Screenplay for "The Other Side of the Street" (2004), shared with Marcos Bernstein
 2007 - (Nominated) Best Adapted Screenplay for "Irma Vap: o retorno" (2006), shared with Adriana Falcão and Carla Camurati
 2009 - (Nominated) Best Adapted Screenplay for "Camila Jam" (2007), shared with: Elena Soarez and Murilo Salles
 2011 - (Nominated) Best Original Screenplay for "Blue Eyes" (2009), shared with: Paulo Halm
 2014 - (Nominated) Best Adapted Screenplay for "My Sweet Orange Tree" (2012), shared with: Marcos Bernstein 
Paulínia Film Festival
 2011 - (Won) Best Screenplay for "Blue Eyes" (2009), shared with: Paulo Halm

References

External links 
 

Brazilian screenwriters
1958 births
Living people
Brazilian women screenwriters